"Area Codes" is a song by the American hip hop recording artist Ludacris, released as the first single from his third album, Word of Mouf (2001). It features Nate Dogg. The song was originally released on the soundtrack to Rush Hour 2. The song's lyrics focus on U.S. telephone area codes that denote the location of women with whom the rapper has had sexual relations in cities across the United States.

The song was written by D. Davis, K. Hilson, J. Jones, R. Walters and C. Bridges and was produced by Jazze Pha.

Overview
At 5m 3s, it is the fifth-longest track on the album.

It entered the Billboard Hot 100 at No. 84 on July 14, 2001, and peaked at No. 24 on September 8, 2001.

The song was also included briefly in a scene from The Fast and the Furious.

Cultural legacy
Because telephone area codes have increasingly become less constrained to particular geographic areas, a cultural critic has noted that the core conceit of the "Area Codes" song may become confusing to future generations of listeners not raised with the concept that a particular area code must be tied to residence in a particular region and not knowledgeable about the assigned area code numbering for major urban areas.

Area codes mentioned
These are the area codes listed in the song, in order:

Charts

Weekly charts

Year-end charts

Certifications

References

External links
Ludacris' Rap Map of US Area Codes
Area codes mentioned in "Area Codes"

2001 singles
2001 songs
Ludacris songs
Nate Dogg songs
Song recordings produced by Jazze Pha
Music videos directed by Marc Klasfeld